Crutcher is a surname. Notable people with the surname include:

 Bettye Crutcher (1939–2022), American songwriter
 Brian Crutcher (b. 1934), English speedway rider
 Chris Crutcher (b. 1946), American novelist
 John Crutcher (1916–2017), American politician
 Mark Crutcher (b. 1948), American anti-abortion advocate
 Ronald Crutcher, American educator and musician
 Terence Crutcher (1976–2016), black man fatally shot by a white police officer in Tulsa, Oklahoma, in 2016

See also 
 Gibson, Dunn, & Crutcher, law firm

English-language surnames